Sisebut (also Sisebuth, Sisebur, Sisebod or Sigebut) ( 565 – February 621) was King of the Visigoths and ruler of Hispania and Septimania from 612 until his death.

Biography
He campaigned successfully against the remains of East Roman power in Spania, strengthened Visigothic control over the Basques and Cantabrians, developed friendly relations with the Lombards of Italy, and reinforced the fleet which had been established by his predecessor Leovigild.

Sisebut was known for his devout piety to Chalcedonian Christianity. In 612, upon his accession to the throne, he forced his Jewish subjects to convert to Christianity. In 616, he ordered that those Jews who refused to convert to Christianity be punished with the lash. He was closely associated and amicable with the scholar and encyclopaedist Isidore, bishop of Seville, and is usually regarded as the author of a Latin poem on astronomy, Carmen de Luna or Praefatio de Libro Rotarum, dedicated to a friend who is identified with Isidore.

He had a son, who succeeded him as Reccared II.

References

7th-century Visigothic monarchs
Medieval Portugal
621 deaths
Year of birth uncertain
7th-century poets
7th-century Latin writers
7th-century astronomers